This is a list of notable converts to Islam from Judaism.

 Abdullah ibn Salam (Al-Husayn ibn Salam) – 6th-century companion of the Islamic prophet Muhammad.
 Safiyya bint Huyayy – Muhammad's wife
 Hibat Allah Abu'l-Barakat al-Baghdaadi (Baruch Ben Malka) – influential 12th-century physicist, philosopher, and scientist who wrote a critique of Aristotelian philosophy and Aristotelian physics.
 Ka'ab al-Ahbar – 7th-century Yemenite Jew. Considered to be the earliest authority on Isra'iliyyat and South Arabian lore.
Ya'qub ibn Killis 10th-century high-ranking official of the Fatimid Caliphate
 Ibn Yahyā al-Maghribī al-Samaw'al – 12th-century mathematician and astronomer.
 Muhammad Asad (Leopold Weiss) – Viennese journalist, author, and translator who visited the Hijaz in the 1930s, and became Pakistani ambassador to the United Nations.
 Sultan Rafi Sharif Bey (Yale Singer) – 20th-century pioneer in the development of Islamic culture in the United States.
 Youssef Darwish – labour lawyer and activist who was one of the few from the Karaite Jewish community to remain in Egypt after the creation of the state of Israel in 1948.
 Tali Fahima – Israeli left-wing activist, convicted of aiding Palestinian fighters. Converted to Islam in Umm al-Fahm in June 2010.
 Rashid-al-Din Hamadani – 13th-century Persian physician
 Yaqub ibn Killis – 10th-century Egyptian vizier under the Fatimids.
 Leila Mourad – Egyptian singer and actress of the 1940s and 1950s.
 Lev Nussimbaum – 20th-century writer, journalist and orientalist.
 Jacob Querido – 17th-century successor of the self-proclaimed Jewish Messiah Sabbatai Zevi.
 Ibn Sahl of Seville – 13th-century Andalusian poet.
 Harun ibn Musa – 8th-century scholar of Hadith and Qira'at, and the first compiler of the different styles of Qur'anic recitation.
 Al-Ru'asi – 8th-century scholar of Arabic grammar and the founder of the Kufan school of grammar.
 Sabbatai Zevi – 17th-century Jewish messiah claimant who converted to Islam under threat of death from the Ottoman authorities.

See also
Islamic–Jewish relations
Dönmeh, followers of Sabbatai Zevi who converted with him

References

Islam from Judaism
Islam